Snehitaru ( Friends) is a 2012 Indian Kannada-language action film written and directed by Ram Narayan and produced by Soundarya Jagadish. It has an ensemble cast including Vijay Raghavendra, Tarun Chandra, Pranitha, Srujan Lokesh and Ravishankar Gowda. Popular actors Darshan and Nikita Thukral are making special appearances, with Darshan playing a pivotal role.

Director Ram Narayan has also written the screenplay and dialogues for the film. V. Harikrishna is the score and soundtrack composer. The film was theatrically released on 5 October 2012 across Karnataka cinema halls. The multi-starrer film had a decent run in at the box office.

Cast

Production
After Masth Maja maadi and Appu Pappu, this is the third film of family of Soundarya Jagadish banner. Master Snehith, son of couple Soundarya and Rekha has an important role in this film. The little star is challenging the stars like Darshan and Nikitha who are in guest roles in this film.

Soundtrack

V. Harikrishna composed the music for the film and the soundtracks, with lyrics for the soundtracks penned by Kaviraj, Shyam Shivamogga and K. Ramnarayan. The album has five soundtracks.

Reception

Critical response 

A critic from The Times of India scored the film at 3 out of 5 stars and says "Pranitha is impressive. Darshan walks away with all the honours in a guest appearance. Master Snehith is sweet in his childish role. Music by V Harikrishna and camera by MR Seenu are added attractions". A critic from DNA wrote "Snehitaru looks more like a platform that producer Soundarya Jagdeesh has used to reintroduce his son and child actor, Snehit. So if you are planning to give the film a miss, all we’ll say is that you are not missing much!". Srikanth Srinivasa from Rediff.com scored the film at 2 out of 5 stars and says "Vijay Raghavendra and Ravishankar are good. Snehith impresses while Pranitha looks good. Ramesh Bhat and Girija Lokesh are adequate. Songs by Gridhar are average. Snehitaru is a light-hearted entertainer". A critic from Pinkvilla wrote ""Snehitharu" is a mass entertainer that will keep the audience fully engaged. It has an interesting script coupled with good performances and neat technical work". A critic from Bangalore Mirror wrote  "He seems to have an unending supply of tunes that hit the bull’s eye every time. His wife and son have also joined forces with him as singers in this film. MR Seenu, the cinematographer is another star performer in the film".

References

Films set in Bangalore
2012 films
2010s Kannada-language films
2010s buddy comedy films
Films scored by V. Harikrishna
Indian buddy comedy films
Films about child abduction in India
2012 comedy films